Scott Richard Studenmund (June 26, 1989 – June 9, 2014) was a United States Army Special Forces soldier. He was killed in action in the 2014 Gaza Valley airstrike in a friendly fire incident that took place in Zabul Province, Afghanistan on June 9, 2014.

Studenmund was awarded the Bronze Star and the Purple Heart.

Early life
Scott Richard Studenmund was born on June 26, 1989, at Huntington Hospital in Pasadena, California. He was the son of former eHarmony executive Jaynie Studenmund and economics professor Woody Studenmund. He is also the grandson of United States Senator Jack R. Miller. He attended Clairbourn School in San Gabriel, California, Flintridge Preparatory School in La Canada, California and Pitzer College prior to volunteering for the U.S. Armed Forces. He played college football as a linebacker for the Pomona-Pitzer Sagehens.

Military career
Studenmund volunteered for the Special Forces 18X Program in 2009. He earned his Green Beret and graduated from the Special Forces Qualification Course in 2011. Studenmund was assigned to Fort Campbell, Kentucky with the 5th Special Forces Group. He was deployed to Afghanistan in 2014.

During the 2014 Gaza Valley airstrike, which took place in the Zabul Province on June 9, 2014, Studenmund was among five U.S. troops alongside one Afghan soldier who were killed when a friendly B-1B Lancer bomber inadvertently dropped laser-guided bombs on their position during a firefight with Taliban forces. As documented in an episode of 60 Minutes, the bomber failed to distinguish friendly troops from the enemy.

Memorial
On June 21, 2014, a memorial service was held for Studenmund at Flintridge Preparatory School. On July 10, 2014, Studenmund was buried at Arlington National Cemetery in Virginia, beside his ODA (Operation Detachment Alpha) teammate Jason McDonald. In 2014, both Clairbourn School and Flintridge Preparatory School established funds named in his honor. Flintridge Preparatory School also honored Studenmund with a memorial wall, while Clairbourn School dedicated their football field to him, renaming it the Scott Studenmund Field.

Studenmund was one of the soldiers honored by having his name inscribed on the Enduring Heroes Memorial erected in Pasadena, California in 2017.

Medals
The Bronze Star Medal
The Purple Heart Medal
The Army Commendation Medal
The Army Achievement Medal
The Meritorious Service Medal
The Army Good Conduct Medal

See also
2014 Gaza Valley airstrike

References

1989 births
2014 deaths
American military personnel killed in the War in Afghanistan (2001–2021)
Burials at Arlington National Cemetery
United States Army non-commissioned officers
Military personnel killed by friendly fire
Military personnel from California
Deaths by American airstrikes
United States Army personnel of the War in Afghanistan (2001–2021)
Pomona-Pitzer Sagehens football players
Players of American football from Pasadena, California
American football linebackers